The Umma Party (Arabic: حزب الأمة, Hizb Al-Umma) is a small Egyptian political party.

History and profile
The party was established in 1983. It was the first party accepted by the Political Party Affairs Committee since the 1950s.

Party principles 
The party:
 Considers Egypt part of the Arab and Islamic world
 Calls for establishing a socialist and democratic system in Egypt
 Calls of the adoption of Islamic law as the main source of legislation
 Supports all efforts to establish peace with Israel
 Calls for building a society on the principles of labor and production

References

1983 establishments in Egypt
Islamic political parties in Egypt
Islamic socialist political parties
Political parties established in 1983
Political parties in Egypt
Socialist parties in Egypt